Panama competed in the 2015 Pan American Games in Toronto, Canada from July 10 to 26, 2015.

Swimmer Édgar Crespo was the flagbearer of the country at the opening ceremony.

Panama finished the competition with two medals, one silver and one bronze, and was ranked 24th overall.

Competitors
The following table lists Panama's delegation per sport and gender.

Medalists

The following competitors from Panama won medals at the games. In the by discipline sections below, medalists' names are bolded.

|style="text-align:left; width:78%; vertical-align:top;"|

Athletics

Men
Track

Women
Track

Field events

Bowling

Panama qualified two male bowlers. 

Singles

Doubles

Fencing

Panama qualified 1 fencer (1 woman).

Football

Men's tournament

Panama's men's U-22 football team qualified to compete at the games after winning the Central American qualifying tournament.

Group A

Semifinals

Bronze medal match

Gymnastics

Panama has qualified two gymnasts.

Artistic
Men
Panama has qualified one male artistic gymnast.

Women
Panama has qualified one female artistic gymnast.

Qualification Legend: Q = Qualified to apparatus final

Modern pentathlon

Panama has qualified a team of 3 athletes (2 men and 1 woman). However, Panama did not register its female athlete for this event.

Men

Shooting

Panama qualified four shooters.

Men

Swimming

Panama qualified two swimmers (one man and one woman).

Taekwondo

Panama qualified a team of one female athlete, and also received a wildcard to enter a male athlete.

Triathlon

Panama has received a wildcard to enter one male triathlete.

Men

Weightlifting

Panama qualified one male and one female weightlifter.

Wrestling

Panama qualified two male wrestlers.

Men

See also
Panama at the 2016 Summer Olympics

References

Nations at the 2015 Pan American Games
P
2015